Porrogszentkirály is a village in Somogy County, Hungary where the Somogy Slovenes still live.

Etymology
According to the local legends Ladislaus I of Hungary came in the area once and a nail fell out of the wheel of his chariot. A cottar noticed it and put his finger in the hole. The king asked him where he lives. But he could not tell him because his village had no name. So the village got the name Szentkirály.

The scientific explanation states that it was named after the patron of its church, Saint Stephen of Hungary, the first saint among the Hungarian kings, like Rinyaszentkirály.

External links 
 Street map (Hungarian)

References 

Populated places in Somogy County